The Catalan Space Agency (Catalan: Agència Espacial de Catalunya; AEC) is a project approved by the Executive Council of the Generalitat de Catalunya on October 27, 2020, and which aims to launch two nanosatellites in the first half of the year 2021. The project, with an initial duration of two years until 2023, envisages the launch of a constellation of up to six satellites with a public investment of 21 million dollars (18 million euros) over four years with part of the co-financing from the European Regional Development Fund. The project would be led by the Ministry of Digital Policies, the Department of Business, and the Department of Territory, and would be part of the plan called "NewSpace Strategy of Catalonia" or "Estratègia NewSpace de Catalunya".

The then Minister of Digital Policies, Jordi Puigneró, explained that this space agency would be responsible for managing the entire government space strategy, and that on October 27, 2020 it had already launched a bidding process for the first two satellites. The project in which the Institute of Space Studies of Catalonia (IEEC) would collaborate would have a budget of 2.5 million euros. The Catalan government's forecast at the time was that this public investment could create 1,200 jobs in the next 5 years, multiplying by 15 the initial amount invested, reaching  approximate  280-300 million euros in these 5 years.

Technology 
As Generalitat de Catalunya has stated, the NewSpace strategy would represent a new use of space, new technologies, a new set of services and, therefore, a new economy based on the democratization of space and the aerospace industry. One of the catalysts for this change would be the emergence of the CubeSat nanosatellite standard (satellites weighing less than 10 kg).

The NewSpace concept is based on the use of smaller satellites, with lower cost and development time, compared to current satellites. They orbit at low altitudes (LEO) and use standard technologies. These characteristics represent a paradigm shift in the way space missions are developed and will enhance the use of their services by many more agents, both in vertical and cross-sectional applications in various productive sectors.

Nanosatellites 
The use of these nanosatellites would be to increase 5G coverage by the Internet of Things (IoT), terrestrial observation, the government's own services, or for example fire control and rescue services in natural spaces and isolated areas. Both the design and launch of the satellites would be tendered to companies that would later also be responsible for developing connectivity services. One of the nanosatellites would serve to "complement terrestrial networks and, for example, improve coverage in natural parks to control herds in the high mountains," said the then General Director of Innovation and Digital Economy, Dani Marco, as well as another, would allow "monitoring from space and in real-time major natural disasters such as catastrophic storms like Gloria or to analyze air pollution." They could also be used to check the state of crops, improve weather forecasting, study water reserves in reservoirs and swamps, or observe light pollution and its effects. The models chosen would weigh from one to ten kilograms and could orbit at an altitude of about 2,000 kilometers at a cost ranging from 500,000 euros to 2 million; they would be of fast design and construction in 6–8 months, having a service life of 4 years.

Strategy 
The promotion of NewSpace is a priority of the Generalitat de Catalunya, which wants to support the deployment of this new space economy to make Catalonia a pole of innovation, leadership and attraction of talent and companies in the field of the growing NewSpace sector. The New Space Strategy of Catalonia will deploy a multidisciplinary, transversal plan focused on the needs of the public administration and the impact on people that will prioritize sectors such as territorial management, agriculture and livestock, hydrography, cartography, public services, among others. As the project promoters stated, the strategy will be deployed around the following main subjects:

 Ecosystem: to promote a model of transversal governance in different areas that support the development of a coordinated New Space ecosystem, connected to the world, that integrates all the actors in the value chain.
 Research and innovation: to promote research and innovation through the application of specific instruments and the establishment of synergies between different departments of the Administration, specialized research and innovation centers, organizations intensive users of the data generated by satellites And the private sector.
 Talent and society: to create, attract and retain specialized talent that drives the development of new services and solutions in the field of New Space, and train professionals from other sectors to face its impact.
 Infrastructures and data: to have experimental satellite infrastructures that allow to validate of new solutions and technologies, and to have new data on which to facilitate a safe, open and transparent access.
 Adoption of New Space services: promote the use of new services and data, facilitated by New Space, as an engine of innovation in the Administration and in strategic sectors such as territory, agriculture and livestock, the hydrographic, cartographic and public services among others.
 Regulatory framework: to establish an administrative structure that provides  legal and regulatory frameworks for applications to the New Space.

Project Opportunities 
Catalonia already has experience in launching missions and designing payloads and ground stations, it also has knowledge in the field of telecommunications, with several research centers of great solvency, capacity and experience such as MareNostrum Supercomputing Center and other entities. Another favorable factor is the fact that Barcelona is the world capital of mobile phones and home to the main technology fairs in the world. All this would help to have a better attraction of private capital that complements all the activities carried out by the public sector and start-ups.

Apart from the companies and research groups that are working in what we could call how the traditional space, at present, the knowledge and R&D ecosystem “New Space” in Catalonia is focused on the following main actors: the UPC, and in particular the UPC NanoSat Lab, the Institut d'Estudis Espacials de Catalunya, and more recently the i2Cat and the CTTC which are bringing the experience of how new 5G services can impact this sector emerging.

Catalonia currently has some leadership in this sector with nearly 30 emerging companies, some of which are world leaders, such as OpenCosmos, Sateliot, Pangea and Zero2Infinity. There are 13 leading research and innovation centers in this field, as well as with one of the business incubation centers of the European Space Agency, the ESA BIC Barcelona, located in the Mediterranean Technology Park of Castelldefels, sharing space with EETAC, the Castlldefels School of Telecommunication and Aerospace Engineering.

See also
 Instituto Nacional de Técnica Aeroespacial
 Institut de Ciències de l'Espai

References

Further reading 

 

Space program of Spain